Sanjiva Weerawarana is a CEO, software developer and open-source software evangelist.  He is known for his work on Web Services standards including WSDL, BPEL, and WS-Addressing. He is the founder, chairman and CEO of WSO2, an open-source middleware company, and creator of the Ballerina programming language. His involvement with the Apache Software Foundation includes project work on SOAP, Apache Axis and Apache Axis2.

Early life and education
Weerawarana attended Kent State University, majoring in applied mathematics / computer science, before completing a PhD at Purdue University.

Career
After graduation, Weerawarana joined IBM Research working in Hawthorne, New York, until he left to found the startup WSO2. 

Weerawarana has been involved with the Apache Software Foundation since 2000 when he worked on the original Apache SOAP project. Weerawarana is an elected Member of the Foundation and is a committer on several projects.

Weerawarana set up the Lanka Software Foundation, and was involved with the Sahana FOSS Disaster Management System. 

He is an advisory board member of the company 24/7 Techies. He is a visiting professor and lecturer at the University of Moratuwa and a board alumnus of the Open Source Initiative.

He currently lives in Colombo, Sri Lanka.

Publications
Notable research publications include:
 Colombo: Lightweight middleware for service-oriented computing
 Enterprise Services

Books

See also
 Apache Software Foundation
 Open Source Initiative
 WSO2

References

External links
 Sanjiva Weerawarana's Blog
 Lanka Software Foundation
 W3C Working Draft on WSDL ver 1.2
 Sanjiva Weerawarana's profile Page at wso2.com
 WSO2 home page 
 Board of Directors - Lanka Software Foundation
 Sanjeeva Weerawarana in Business Week

American bloggers
Sri Lankan computer programmers
Living people
Members of the Open Source Initiative board of directors
People from Colombo
American computer programmers
Year of birth missing (living people)